Dysomma anguillare, the shortbelly eel, stout moray, mustard eel or arrowtooth eel, is an eel in the family Synaphobranchidae (cutthroat eels). It was described by Keppel Harcourt Barnard in 1923. It is a marine, tropical eel which is known from the western Atlantic Ocean and Indo-Western Pacific, including the United States, Venezuela, South Africa, Zanzibar, and Japan.

The shortbelly eel is of no commercial interest to fisheries.

References

Synaphobranchidae
Fish described in 1923